Milovan Savić (born 16 June 1953 in Novi Sad) is a Croatian former middle distance runner who competed for SFR Yugoslavia in the 1976 Summer Olympics and in the 1980 Summer Olympics.

References

External links
 

1953 births
Living people
Sportspeople from Novi Sad
Croatian male middle-distance runners
Yugoslav male middle-distance runners
Olympic athletes of Yugoslavia
Athletes (track and field) at the 1976 Summer Olympics
Athletes (track and field) at the 1980 Summer Olympics
Universiade medalists in athletics (track and field)
Mediterranean Games gold medalists for Yugoslavia
Mediterranean Games medalists in athletics
Athletes (track and field) at the 1975 Mediterranean Games
Universiade silver medalists for Yugoslavia
Medalists at the 1977 Summer Universiade